Daniel Ainsleigh (born 8 February 1976 in Hexham, Northumberland) is an English actor and acting coach. Born in Hexham, Ainsleigh attended the Webber Douglas Academy of Dramatic Art and has worked extensively in theatre, film and television.

Filmography

Film

Television

References

External links

1976 births
People from Hexham
English male television actors
English acting coaches
Alumni of the Webber Douglas Academy of Dramatic Art
Living people